Oenothera speciosa is a species in the Oenothera (evening primrose) family known by several common names, including pinkladies, pink evening primrose, showy evening primrose, Mexican primrose, amapola, and buttercups (not to be confused with true buttercups in the genus Ranunculus).

Description
Oenothera speciosa is a herbaceous perennial wildflower. They are variable in shape, from linear to obovate, and are toothed or wavy-edged. It produces single, four-petaled, cup-shaped flowers on the upper leaf axils. These fragrant shell-pink flowers bloom throughout the summer into early autumn. The  flowers start out white and turn pink as they age. 

The flower throats, as well as the stigmas and stamens, have a soft yellow color. It blooms both day and night, but typically in the pre-dawn hours, closing when the full sun hits them. They bloom from March to July, and occasionally in the fall. The flowers are frequented by several insect species, but moths are the most common as the flowers are mostly open at night.

Taxonomy 
The specific name, speciosa, means "showy".

This plant is frequently referred to as a buttercup, though it is not a true buttercup (genus Ranunculus), or even in the buttercup family, Ranunculaceae.

Varieties 
The species has the following varieties:
Oenothera speciosa var. berlandieri (Spach) Munz
Oenothera speciosa var. childsii (L.H. Bailey) Munz
Oenothera speciosa var. speciosa

Distribution and habitat
Originally native to the grasslands of Kansas, Missouri, Nebraska, northeastern New Mexico, Oklahoma, and Texas, it has been naturalized in 28 of the lower 48 U.S. states as well as Chihuahua and Coahuila in Mexico. It frequently escapes from gardens.

The plant's wild habitat includes rocky prairies, open woodlands, slopes, roadsides, meadows and disturbed areas. While it makes an attractive garden plant, care should be taken with it as it can become invasive, spreading by runners and seeds. This drought-resistant plant prefers loose, fast-draining soil and full sun. It is a groundcover.

The pink evening primrose is used in the temperate latitudes as an ornamental plant, but does not survive severe winters. Within the United States Department of Agriculture's hardiness zone climates 4 to 9, and in most areas of Central Europe, the species should be sufficiently hardy. In Europe plant has been reported to cause deaths of eurasian hummingbird hawk-moth as they get stuck into the flower while foraging.

Uses
The green plant parts can be cooked or eaten as a salad; the taste is pleasant when harvested before flowers develop.

Gallery

References

Further reading

External links

 
Oenothera speciosa photos, Vanderbilt University 
 

speciosa
Plants described in 1821
Night-blooming plants
Flora of North America